Participatient is an smartphone app created as an academic project in the Netherland to use eHealth to involve patients in decision making during their stay. This project started at Dutch Hacking Health (DHH) and won the 2016 DHH award for best eHealth innovation, under the name 'Bedpartner'.

The current Participatient app has modules with information on the ward and the admission, pain medication, and urinary catheter use, with the goal to give patients the option to participate and make the hospital stay safer and more pleasant.
The app is designed to encourage communication and awareness in patients and medical staff. This will be evaluated in the PECCA project (Patient Engagement Counter CAUTI with an App), supported by the Netherlands organisation for health research and development (ZonMw).

Participatient is one of the founding projects of the Dutch National eHealth Living Lab (NeLL).

References

External links

Healthcare in the Netherlands
Health informatics